Eric Maddox is an American public speaker, author and former special operations soldier. He was attached to a Task Force Special Operations team in Tikrit that was part of the Joint Special Operations Command responsible for tracking down the most wanted men in Iraq. During his six month tour with this Task Force team, Eric conducted over 300 interrogations and collected intelligence which directly led to the capture of Saddam Hussein.

Early life 
Eric Maddox graduated from Sapulpa High School in 1990 and later from the University of Oklahoma where he made an appointment with an on campus recruiter and enlisted in the United States Army.

Military career 
Maddox enlisted as an infantry paratrooper for the 82nd Airborne Division.  He became a jumpmaster and entered Ranger School. After spending three years as a paratrooper with a Ranger tab, Maddox reenlisted as an interrogator and Chinese Mandarin linguist.

In 2003, three months after U.S. forces invaded Iraq, Maddox received orders to report to the Baghdad International Airport. There he was assigned to a Task Force team in Tikrit.

Career 
Eric Maddox is a conference and inspirational speaker teaching the story of his interrogation methods and how every perceived failure leads forward.

Maddox created a unique methodology and technique for interrogation, which directly led to the capture of Saddam Hussein. Maddox teaches this unique methodology called 'Empathy Based Listening'.

Awards 
Maddox was awarded the Legion of Merit, the National Intelligence Medal of Achievement, the Defense Intelligence Agency’s Director’s Award and the Bronze Star.

Books and movies 
Maddox authored the book: Mission: Blacklist #1

Media appearances 
Maddox has been featured in media around the world and many documentaries and TV series feature Maddox telling his story of how Delta Force tracked down and captured Saddam Hussein.  This includes CNN, The History Channel, National Public Radio, The Daily Mail, Fox News and more.

References

Delta Force
Interrogations
Living people
University of Oklahoma alumni
Paratroopers
American motivational speakers
21st-century American non-fiction writers
American male non-fiction writers
American military writers
Year of birth missing (living people)
21st-century American male writers